Allium corsicum is a plant species endemic to the Island of Corsica in the Mediterranean.

Allium corsicum produces a spherical to egg-shaped bulb and a stipe up to 60 cm tall. Leaves are flat and hairless, about 3 mm wide. Umbel has many bell-shaped flowers, white or pink with dark purple midveins.

References

corsicum
Onions
Flora of Corsica
Plants described in 2002